The Samsung Galaxy Tab 3 Lite 7.0 is a 7-inch Android-based tablet computer produced and marketed by Samsung Electronics.

History 
The Galaxy Tab 3 Lite 7.0 was announced on 16 January 2014. It was available at the price of $159.

Colors 
The Samsung Galaxy Tab 3 came in three colors on its 2013 release, Black, White, and Gold-Brown. Four more colors were later introduced in 2014, Peach Pink, Blue Green, and Lemon Yellow.

Features
The Galaxy Tab 3 Lite 7.0 was released with Android 4.2.2 Jelly Bean. Samsung has customized the interface with its TouchWiz UX software. As well as apps from Google, including Google Play, Gmail and YouTube, it has access to Samsung apps such as S Voice, S Planner.

The Galaxy Tab 3 Lite 7.0 is available in WiFi-only and 3G & Wi-Fi variants. Storage is only 8 GB on each model, with a microSD card slot for expansion. It has a 7-inch TFT LCD screen with a resolution of 1024x600 pixels, and only a rear-facing camera.

References

Samsung Galaxy Tab series
Android (operating system) devices
Tablet computers introduced in 2014
Tablet computers